The 6th Vietnamese Parachute Battalion (Fr: 6e bataillon de parachutistes vietnamiens) was a French-Vietnamese paratroop battalion formed in French Indochina in 1954.

Operational history 
The 6th Vietnamese Parachute Battalion (6 BPVN) was one of five battalions of Vietnamese paratroopers raised by the French Army between 1951 and 1957 as part of General Jean de Lattre de Tassigny's policy to establish a Vietnamese Army.

Commanding officers

See also 

 1st Vietnamese Parachute Battalion
 3rd Vietnamese Parachute Battalion
 5th Vietnamese Parachute Battalion
 7th Vietnamese Parachute Battalion
 1st Cambodian Parachute Regiment
 1st Laotian Parachute Battalion

Military units and formations of the First Indochina War
Vietnam
Vietnam
Vietnamese Parachute Battalion
Vietnamese Parachute Battalion
Vietnamese Parachute Regiment
Vietnamese Parachute Battalion
Vietnamese Parachute Battalion